Recadaire de Behanzin is an anti-government newspaper published in Benin.

It was established in 1915 and Emile Zinsou Bode was one of its founders.

See also
List of newspapers in Benin

References

Newspapers published in Benin
Publications established in 1915
French-language newspapers published in Africa